Eskil is a masculine given name mainly in use in Scandinavia. In Danish and Norwegian it may be spelled Eskild. The name may refer to:

Saint Eskil, 11th century Anglo-Saxon monk and missionary
Eskil Brodd (1885–1969), Swedish diver
Eskil Brøndbo (born 1970), Norwegian drummer
Eskild Ebbesen (born 1972), Danish rower
Eskil Erlandsson (born 1957), Swedish politician
Eskil Ervik (born 1975), Norwegian speedskater
Eskil Falk (1889–1963), Swedish track and field athlete
Eskil Hagen (born 1970), Norwegian paralympian
Eskil Hemberg (1938–2004), Swedish composer and conductor
Eskild Jensen (1925–2013), Norwegian civil servant and politician
Eskil Kinneberg (born 1992), Norwegian orienteer
Eskil of Lund, Danish 12th century archbishop
Eskil Lundahl (1905–1992), Swedish swimmer
Eskil Magnusson (1175–1227), Swedish politician and lawmaker
Eskil Pedersen (born 1984), Norwegian politician
Eskil Rønningsbakken (born 1979), Norwegian balance artist
Eskil Suter (born 1967), Swiss motorcycle racer and constructor
Eskil Vogt (born 1974), Norwegian film director and screenwriter

Other uses 
 Eskil, the main character of the novel Vale of the Vole by Piers Anthony
 Eskil, Aksaray Province, a town in Turkey
 Eskilstuna, a city in Sweden